The Philippines competed at the 2020 Winter Youth Olympics in Lausanne, Switzerland, returning to the Games after missing the previous edition. 

The Philippine team consist of two competitors, its first female Winter Youth Olympian in Ana Noelle Wahleithner and its first speed skater Julian Macaraeg. Bones Floro is the chef de mission of the Philippine delegation.

Alpine skiing

Philippines has qualified 1 athlete.

Girls

Short track speed skating

Philippines has qualified 1 athlete. New York-based Julian Macaraeg is the first short track speed skater to compete for the Philippines. His coach is Serhiy Lifyrenko. Macaraeg competed in the men's 500 m and 1000 m events. In the former he reach the quarterfinals after finishing first in the heats clocking 43.235 seconds. With a record of 42.046 seconds, he finished fourth in the men's 500 m quarterfinals failing to advance to the semifinals. In the men's 1000 m he failed to advance to the quarterfinals. Macaraeg also competed as part of a Mixed-NOC team in the Mixed NOC team relay event along with three other skaters from other countries. They settled for the Finals B after finishing fourth in the first semifinal. They failed to record a time after they were penalized in the Finals B.

Boys

Team

See also
Philippines at the 2020 Summer Olympics

References

2020 in Philippine sport
Nations at the 2020 Winter Youth Olympics
Winter Youth Olympics, 2020